Muhamed Konjić (born 14 May 1970) is a Bosnian retired professional footballer who played as a centre-back, most notably for Monaco, Coventry City and the Bosnia and Herzegovina national team who he also captained.

Club career
A solid defender, he played for many clubs around Europe including FC Zürich, AS Monaco, Coventry City and Derby County.

Konjić played in Jean Tigana's talented Monaco side which famously put Manchester United out of the Champions League in 1998 on away goals after a 1–1 draw at Old Trafford.

Early in 1999, Konjić was recruited by Gordon Strachan, manager of English Premiership side Coventry City for a fee of around £2 million. Injuries prevented fans from getting a real glimpse of the player though, as he made just 19 appearances before the club's relegation at the end of the 2000–01 season.

In the next three seasons, all of which were spent in the Championship. 'Big Mo' (as he was nicknamed by Sky Blues fans) made 138 appearances, and scored four goals. During this period, Konjić had captained the club and became a fan favourite. He was renowned both for his fully committed style of play and also his willingness to bring the ball forward if the midfield and attack were not having any impact. 

He was sold at the end of the 2003–04 season to Derby County by then Sky Blues manager Peter Reid. In the 2004–05 season, he made 18 appearances in George Burley's Derby side which reached the Football League Championship play-offs. Injuries have continued to hamper his progress, and he made just one appearance for Derby in the 2005–06 season as a result. He was released at the end of the season and subsequently retired from playing.

International career
 
Konjić was an influential player in the Bosnian-Herzegovinian squad, for whom he was capped 39 times and scoring 3 goals. He was the captain in the first match played by Bosnia and Herzegovina on 30 November 1995. This match, a 2–0 defeat to Albania, famously came just nine days after the Dayton Peace Agreement brought an end to the Bosnian conflict.

His final international was an August 2006 friendly match against France.

Personal life
Konjić spent the first eight months of the Bosnian War in his country's army. After his military discharge he trained in the streets, often during artillery raids when everybody else was covering in bomb shelters or cellars.

Career statistics
Scores and results list Bosnia and Herzegovina's goal tally first, score column indicates score after each Konjić goal.

Honours
Individual
 Coventry City F.C. Player of the Year: 2003

References

External links
 
 

1970 births
Living people
Sportspeople from Tuzla
Bosniaks of Bosnia and Herzegovina
Association football sweepers
Yugoslav footballers
Bosnia and Herzegovina footballers
Bosnia and Herzegovina international footballers
FK Famos Hrasnica players
FK Sloboda Tuzla players
NK Belišće players
FK Sarajevo players
NK Zagreb players
FC Zürich players
AS Monaco FC players
Coventry City F.C. players
Derby County F.C. players
Yugoslav First League players
Croatian Football League players
Swiss Super League players
Ligue 1 players
Premier League players
English Football League players
Bosnia and Herzegovina expatriate footballers
Expatriate footballers in Croatia
Bosnia and Herzegovina expatriate sportspeople in Croatia
Expatriate footballers in Switzerland
Bosnia and Herzegovina expatriate sportspeople in Switzerland
Expatriate footballers in Monaco
Bosnia and Herzegovina expatriate sportspeople in Monaco 
Expatriate footballers in England
Bosnia and Herzegovina expatriate sportspeople in England